"Love's Grown Deep" is a song by Kenny Nolan, taken from his eponymous debut album. The recording was issued as his follow-up to his major hit song, "I Like Dreamin'" and is similar in style.

"Love's Grown Deep" reached No. 20 on the U.S. Billboard Hot 100.  It also hit No. 3 on the Adult Contemporary chart. The song was an equally large hit in Canada, where it likewise peaked at No. 20 on the Pop Singles chart and reached No. 1 on the Adult Contemporary chart.

Chart performance

Weekly charts

Year-end charts

Cover versions
"Love's Grown Deep" was covered by Shalamar on their 1987 LP, Circumstantial Evidence.

References

External links
 

1977 singles
1976 songs
20th Century Fox Records singles
Kenny Nolan songs
Songs written by Kenny Nolan
Songs written by Bob Crewe